Bonniconlon GAA is a Gaelic football club located in the north County Mayo, Ireland. Based in the village of Bonniconlon, the club participates in competitions organised by the Mayo GAA county board.

Honours
 Mayo Intermediate Football Championship (2): 1986, 1997
 Mayo Junior Football Championship (1): 1978
  North Mayo Junior Football Championship (1): 1978

References

Gaelic football clubs in County Mayo
Gaelic games clubs in County Mayo